Victor Brian Hobson (born February 3, 1980) is a former American football linebacker in the National Football League (NFL) and an executive producer for Global Entertainment. He was drafted in the second round of the 2003 NFL Draft by the New York Jets, for whom he played from 2003 to 2007. He played for the Cincinnati Bengals and Arizona Cardinals of the NFL In 2008. Hobson played college football at the University of Michigan.

Early life

Hobson was born in Mount Laurel, New Jersey, where he grew up for most of his life. He commuted from New Jersey to Philadelphia for his high school football career at St. Joseph's Preparatory. His coach saw that Hobson had large hands and feet to accompany his awkward walk and thin 6-2 frame and thus was nicknamed "Little Pup." At the end of his sophomore year he had grown to a 215-pound frame, meriting the nickname "Big Dog." At St. Joe's he started at both middle linebacker and tight end. In 1997, he led the St. Joe's prep football team to their first championship in 20 years and was voted the Catholic League best all-around player. Among almost 40 division I football offers he chose to attend his lifetime favorite school, the University of Michigan.

Football career

College

At the University of Michigan, Hobson started 39 of 49 games for the Wolverines, registering 277 tackles, 15 sacks, 3 fumble recoveries, 4 forced fumbles, 6 passes defensed, and 2 interceptions. His 47 stops for losses placed him third all time in Michigan history behind Curtis Greer and Mark Messner. He was named the 2000 winner of The Roger Zatkoff Award as the team's best linebacker. He entered the NFL draft after his senior year at Michigan.

NFL

After the NFL scouting combine listed him as the number 2 out of 34 linebacker prospects, he was drafted 53rd overall in the second round by the New York Jets, joining his fellow Michigan teammate B. J. Askew (fullback), also drafted by the Jets in 2003.  Hobson lasted five seasons in New York City. In 2006, he registered a career high 100 tackles on 66 solo tackles and 34 assisted tackles and 6 sacks.

NFL statistics

Philanthropy

In 2006 Hobson and his wife L’Tesia started the Hobson & Hobson outreach in spring of 2006. They have pledged millions to set up homes abroad including the United States for children and adults with special needs.

Film entertainment

Hobson works at Global entertainment, founded in 2010, where he acts as a writer, producer, and director. He was the Executive Producer for the film “C’mon Man”, released on June 26, 2012. Hobson and his wife continued to work on multiple motion pictures.

Personal life

Hobson and his wife, director and film Producer L'tesia Asensio Hobson, reside in London and Beverly Hills. They have seven children.

References

1980 births
Living people
American football linebackers
Arizona Cardinals players
Cincinnati Bengals players
Michigan Wolverines football players
New England Patriots players
New York Jets players
People from Mount Laurel, New Jersey
African-American players of American football
St. Joseph's Preparatory School alumni
21st-century African-American sportspeople
20th-century African-American people